General Musa Khan Akbarzada (born 1956, in Paktia Province) is a politician in Afghanistan, serves as the governor of Ghazni province from 2010 to 2015. He is an ethnic Pashtun from the Ahmadzai tribe. His former careers include Consul General in Afghan consulate general in Peshawar, Pakistan, during the government of Burhanuddin Rabbani in early 1990s, after this he was appointed as Afghan Ambassador to Riyadh Kingdom of Saudi Arabia.

.

served as Afghan Ambassador to Riyadh Kingdom of Saudi Arabia

Prior to that he was a commander for Abdul Rasul Sayyaf and before that he was a general in the Afghan National Army, during the time of the Daud Khan administration in the 1970s.

He has been praised by the New York Times for, among other things, supporting girls' education.

References

External links

Governors of Ghazni Province
People from Paktia Province
Pashtun people
Living people
1950 births